Irina Yevgenevna Gribulina  (born  September 29, 1953, Sochi)  is a Russian pop singer, composer, poet. She was the winner of the Television Festival Pesnya goda' 87.

Early life 
Gribulina was born September 29, 1953 in Sochi. Her mother  was an operetta  actress  and singer in Sochi, and her father was journalist and writer. She has written poetry and music performed on stage Sochi native city.

In 1962 and 1972 she studied at the Central Music School at the Moscow Conservatory in the class of Dmitri Kabalevsky. From age 14 she began to act in a professional pop stage with well-known local artists those years.

Career 
After graduating from the conservatory Gribulina performed her own songs, and began working as a composer and a poet with many famous domestic singers and actors.  The first performers of her songs were Valery Leontiev and Lyudmila Gurchenko.

Irina Gribulina is the author of music and poems to songs, hymns and musicals.

Personal life
In 1996 Gribulina gave birth to a daughter, Anastasia.

References

External links
 Official Site
 Ирина Грибулина: «Человек должен учиться не ради оценок, а ради знаний»

1953 births
Living people
People from Sochi
Soviet women singer-songwriters
Russian women singer-songwriters
Russian women musicians
Soviet women composers
Russian women composers
Soviet women poets
Soviet poets
20th-century Russian women writers
Moscow Conservatory alumni
Russian women poets
20th-century Russian women singers
20th-century Russian singers
20th-century women composers